Dieter Eckstein (born 12 March 1964) is a German former professional footballer who played as a striker.

Club career 
Eckes was born in Kehl. He played for several German clubs, as well as clubs in Switzerland, and West Ham United in England.

International career 
Eckstein played for the West Germany national team, earning seven caps. Eckstein was a participant at the EURO 1988.

After retirement
On 1 July 2011, while playing in a charity match for amateur side VfR Regensburg, Eckstein had a heart failure and fell into a coma. He was transferred to the University hospital at Regensburg, where his situation was stabilised. The incident is thought to not have caused any permanent damage to his body.

References

External links
 
 
 

Living people
1964 births
People from Kehl
Sportspeople from Freiburg (region)
German footballers
Footballers from Baden-Württemberg
Germany international footballers
Germany under-21 international footballers
Association football forwards
UEFA Euro 1988 players
Bundesliga players
2. Bundesliga players
1. FC Nürnberg players
Eintracht Frankfurt players
FC Schalke 04 players
SV Waldhof Mannheim players
West Ham United F.C. players
FC Winterthur players
FC Augsburg players
German football managers
West German footballers
German expatriate footballers
German expatriate sportspeople in England
German expatriate sportspeople in Switzerland
Expatriate footballers in England
Expatriate footballers in Switzerland